Tomás Alberto Campos Alejandre (born 14 September 1975) is a Mexican former professional footballer, who was captain for Indios de Ciudad Juárez in the Liga de Ascenso, and interim manager for Juárez.

Campos was part of the Cruz Azul side that became the first national team to reach the final of the Copa Libertadores.

A left-sided wingback or midfielder, Campos earned seven caps for Mexico in 2001 and 2002, scoring one goal. He was a part of the first selection called up by Javier Aguirre upon Aguirre's first appointment as national team head coach in June 2001.

Managerial career

FC Juárez

B team 

Campos was appointed the coach of the newly formed Tercera División affiliate team of FC Juárez for the 2017–18 season. Campos maintained an undefeated streak of 21 matches.
On 19 March 2018, the board of FC Juárez announced that Campos would be the interim manager for the rest of the first team's Clausura 2018 season, after sacking Miguel Fuentes.

International goals

|- bgcolor=#DFE7FF
| 1. || October 31, 2001 || Puebla, Mexico ||  || 4–1 || Win || Friendly || 
|}
Mexico national football team 1000th goal

Honours 
Indios de Ciudad Juárez
Primera División A: Apertura 2007
Campeón de Ascenso: 2007–08 Primera División A

References

External links
 
 

1975 births
Living people
Footballers from Veracruz
Chiapas F.C. footballers
Cruz Azul footballers
Tigres UANL footballers
Indios de Ciudad Juárez footballers
Liga MX players
2002 CONCACAF Gold Cup players
Association football midfielders
Mexican footballers
FC Juárez managers
Mexican football managers
Mexico international footballers